Amiocentrus is a genus of humpless casemaker caddisflies in the family Brachycentridae. There are at least two described species in Amiocentrus.

Species
These two species belong to the genus Amiocentrus:
 Amiocentrus aspilus (Ross, 1938)
 Amiocentrus tessellatum (Bradley, 1924)

References

Further reading

 
 
 

Trichoptera genera
Articles created by Qbugbot